Olifantsnek Dam, is an arch type dam located on the Hex River, near Rustenburg, North West, South Africa. It was established in 1929. The dam serves mainly for irrigation purposes and its hazard potential has been ranked high (3).

See also
 List of reservoirs and dams in South Africa

References 

Dams in South Africa
Buildings and structures in North West (South African province)
Dams completed in 1928
1928 establishments in South Africa